Syed Baqar Askary fondly known as Dr. Askary is the Founder Trustee and CEO of Fatima Jinnah Dental College (FJDC), Karachi. Baqar Askary is a medical graduate of 1966, of Dow Medical College, Karachi Pakistan. Baqar Askary a senior medical practitioner and an educationist. FJDC founded in 1992 is a pioneer institution devoted to the teaching of dentistry, independently and not as a department of any medical college. The college is named "Fatima Jinnah Dental College" after Mohtarma Fatima Jinnah one of the pioneers of Pakistan and sister of Mohammad Ali Jinnah, the founder of Pakistan.

It was quickly made clear that neither the federal government nor the Sindh Government had any plans to set up a Dental College in Karachi, in 1989 Federal Government of Pakistan, however, as a consolation, announced that it will allow such an institution to be established in the private sector. On 20 February 1993, which was the centenary year of the birth of the Mohtarma, to mark the occasion Baqak Askary addressing a press conference, announced that the establishment of this College was a gift to the Nation. With intimation to the Federal and Provincial Ministers of Health, the Pakistan Medical & Dental Council and the University of Karachi, Fatima Jinnah Dental College was founded.

Fatima Jinnah Dental College and Hospital Trust
The Fatima Jinnah Dental College was established and is being run and managed by a duly registered Fatima Jinnah Dental College & Hospital Trust. It is a public charitable Trust, Syed Hashim Raza, a civil servant and the administrator of the Estate of Mohammad Ali Jinnah, was its first chairman. Baqar Askary came to be known as the founder Trustee and Chief Executive of Fatima Jinnah Dental College and Hospital Trust.

Services to public health

He was also elected by the registered medical practitioners of Sindh Province as Member, Pakistan Medical & Dental Council (PM & DC) in the year 2000. Appointed in January 2005, by the Federal Ministry of Health, on a six-member Committee, for Amendments to the PM & DC Ordinance 1962 and Act of 1973. He is actively associated with the formulation of health policy and its implementation for health delivery program in Pakistan.

Early professional life 
He was elected President of Dow Medical College Student's Union-1962-63, and President, National Student Federation, Pakistan for the period – 1963–65, during which he successfully led students' movement for the achievement of better facilities and for raising the standard of education in the country. Successful student's movements provided Karachi with a second medical college – Sindh Medical College at Jinnah Post Graduate Medical Centre, in the public sector and Dawood Engineering College in the private sector. The University of Karachi allowed degree courses in city colleges, etc. As a result of an agreement reached between the then Governor of West Pakistan, Nawab Amir Mohammad of Kalabagh and the students in 1963 at Lahore reforms and improvements were brought about in the educational policies of the Government. Baqar Askary motivated and brought Mohtarma Fatima Jinnah into national politics and persuaded her to contest the general elections during the first martial law.

References

External links
 Fjdc.edu.pk

Pakistani dentists
Muhajir people
Living people
Year of birth missing (living people)